The Davis Mill is a historic stamp mill located off of North Bloomfield Road northeast of Nevada City, California. The mill served the Randolph Mine, a small gold mine run by the Davis family, from 1915 to 1940. It included the standard machinery of an early 20th century stamp mill, which consisted of a stamp battery, a rock crusher, an ore bin, an amalgamation table, concentrators, and a retort room. These parts were enclosed in a multi-story metal structure. The components and layout of the mill are well-preserved, providing an example of how miners processed ore in a stamp mill.

The mill was added to the National Register of Historic Places on April 1, 2010.

References

Industrial buildings and structures on the National Register of Historic Places in California
National Register of Historic Places in Nevada County, California
1915 establishments in California
Industrial buildings completed in 1915